Vedat Dalokay (10 November 1927 – 21 March 1991) was a renowned Turkish architect and a former mayor of Ankara.

Early life and education
He was born in Elazığ in 1927 to İbrahim Bey from Pertek. He completed his elementary and secondary education in Elazığ. Then he left for Istanbul where he graduated from the faculty of architecture of Istanbul Technical University in 1949. His lecturers there were Clemens Holzmeister and  Paul Bonatz. In 1950 he settled to Paris to begin post-graduate studies at the City Planning Department of the Sorbonne University in Paris, France, but then did not graduate.

Career

Following his graduation in 1949, he entered the Ministry of Works and the Post and Telecommunications Department. 

In the 1973 Turkish local elections, he was elected as the mayor of Ankara from the Republican People's Party (CHP). In 1977 Dalokay and other CHP mayors, including İstanbul mayor Ahmet İsvan and İzmit mayor Erol Köse issued a declaration on municipal socialism. Dalokay had served as mayor of Ankara until the 1977 Turkish local elections and was replaced by another CHP member, Ali Dinçer in the post.

Awards and work
Along with numerous national award-winning projects in Turkey, Dalokay has been awarded internationally for the Islamic Development Bank (1981) in Riyadh, Saudi Arabia.

His design for the Kocatepe Mosque in the Turkish capital, Ankara was selected in the architectural competition in 1957 but, as a result of controversial criticism, was not built. Later, a modified design was used as a basis for the Faisal Mosque in Islamabad, Pakistan. In Pakistan, he was also the architect of two not realized buildings, then of the constricted monument Summit Minar, Lahore and is considered a major Turkish influence in Pakistani architecture.

Death
Vedat Dalokay passed away with his wife Ayçe Dalokay (aged 44) in a traffic accident near Kırıkkale on 21 March 1991. His son Barış Dalokay (aged 17), who was injured in the accident, also died on 27 March 1991.

See also
 List of Turkish architects

References

Sources
Drawings and model photos of Vedat Dalokay's unbuilt mosque design for the Kocatepe Mosque
Animation of Vedat Dalokay's unbuilt mosque design for the Kocatepe Mosque
As, Imdat "The Kocatepe Mosque Experience, " in Emergent Design: Rethinking Contemporary Mosque Architecture in Light of Digital Technology, S.M.Arch.S. Thesis, Massachusetts Institute of Technology, Cambridge, MA, 2002. pp.24-46

External links
 
 

1927 births
1991 deaths
People from Elazığ
Zaza Alevis
Republican People's Party (Turkey) politicians
Workers' Party of Turkey politicians
Populist Party (Turkey) politicians
Social Democracy Party (Turkey) politicians
Social Democratic Populist Party (Turkey) politicians
People's Labor Party politicians
Mayors of Ankara
Road incident deaths in Turkey
20th-century Turkish architects
Burials at Cebeci Asri Cemetery